Riedelberg is a municipality in Südwestpfalz district, in Rhineland-Palatinate, western Germany.

References

Municipalities in Rhineland-Palatinate
Südwestpfalz